The Gambler is a 2013 Lithuanian drama film directed by Ignas Jonynas.  An ambulance driver is addicted to gambling. It was selected as the Lithuanian entry for the Best Foreign Language Film at the 87th Academy Awards, but was not nominated.

Cast
 Vytautas Kaniušonis as Vincentas
 Oona Mekas as Ieva

See also
 List of submissions to the 87th Academy Awards for Best Foreign Language Film
 List of Lithuanian submissions for the Academy Award for Best Foreign Language Film

References

External links
 

2013 films
2013 drama films
Lithuanian-language films
Films about gambling
Lithuanian drama films